Aarsha Chandini Baiju (born 8 November 1999) is an Indian actress working in Malayalam film industry. After making her acting debut with the film Pathinettam Padi (2019), she has since starred in the Karikku Fliq mini series Average Ambili (2021) and Mukundan Unni Associates (2022) as the female lead.

Early life 

Aarsha was born on 8 November 1999, in Mannar, Alappuzha, in a family of educators. After schooling, she completed her Bachelor's in English literature from Kristu Jyoti College of Management and Technology and is currently pursuing master's degree at St. Aloysius College, Edathua. She secured grade A in Mahatma Gandhi University Youth Festival in 2018.

Career 
Aarsha first appeared in a brief role in the Malayalam film Pathinettam Padi in 2019, which marked the directorial debut of scenarist-actor Shankar Ramakrishnan.

In 2021, she played the title role in the miniseries Average Ambili, produced by Karikku Fliq. She gained attention for her portrayal of an average student who tries to fight her way through the patriarchal society. Film critic Arya U.R of The New Indian Express wrote that "Arsha’s acting, where she would speak volumes with a glance or smirk, is one of the most striking elements of Average Ambili". The miniseries which was released on Youtube, received great responses on social media for its unusual storyline.

The following year, Aarsha appeared as the female lead in editor-turned-director Abhinav Sundar Nayak's debut film Mukundan Unni Associates, co-starring Vineeth Sreenivasan, Suraj Venjaramood, Sudhi Koppa and Tanvi Ram. The film was commercially and critically successful. Vignesh Madhu of Cinema Express commented that "It is rare for mainstream female actors to get roles that shatter stereotypes, and Aarsha lapped up the opportunity with both hands".

Aarsha is set to star in costume-designer Stephy Zaviour's unreleased debut film Madhura Manohara Moham and Qurbaani co-starring Shane Nigam.

Filmography

References

External links 
 

Actresses in Malayalam cinema
Indian film actresses
Living people
1999 births
21st-century Indian actresses